Podocarpus palawanensis is a species of conifer in the family Podocarpaceae. It is found only in the Philippines.

References

palawanensis
Critically endangered plants
Flora of Palawan
Taxonomy articles created by Polbot
Taxa named by David John de Laubenfels